Charles Parsons may refer to:

People
 Charles Algernon Parsons (1854–1931), English engineer known for his invention of the steam turbine
 Charles Parsons (philosopher) (born 1933), professor in the philosophy of mathematics at Harvard University
 Chick Parsons (Charles Thomas Parsons, Jr., 1900–1988), American businessman, diplomat, and decorated World War II veteran
 Chuck Parsons (Charles W. Parsons, 1924–1999), American sports car racing driver
 Charlie Parsons (born 1958), television producer
 Charlie Parsons (baseball) (1863–1936), Major League Baseball pitcher
 Charles Parsons (British Army officer) (1855–1923)
 Charles Wynford Parsons (1901–1950) British zoologist
 Charles Lathrop Parsons (1867–1954), American chemist
 Charles "Poss" Parsons (1892–?), American college football player and coach

Organisations

See also
 Charlie Parsons (disambiguation)

Parsons, Charles